The 2019 IAAF World Rankings document the best performing athletes in the sport of athletics, per the International Association of Athletics Federations (IAAF) individual athlete ranking system. It was the first year that the IAAF used the system. Individual athletes are assigned a points score best on an average of their best recent competition performances. The performance scoring is primarily based on the time or mark of the athlete, plus additional points for their placing within the competition, and some minor modifications based on the conditions. The world rankings are updated each Wednesday.

As of 31 March 2020, the number one ranked male athlete is Armand Duplantis with 1515 points, and the number one ranked female athlete is Sifan Hassan with 1528 points.

Overall rankings (top 10)

Event rankings (top 10)

IAAF World Rankings, as of 17 September 2019.

100 metres

Men

Women

20 km racewalking

Men

Women

50 km racewalking

Men

Women

References

IAAF World Rankings
World Rankings. IAAF. Retrieved 2019-10-02.

External links
 IAAF Scoring Tables

Rankings
Summer Olympics qualification
Athletics
IAAF World Rankings